Prisoner of Paradise may refer to:

 Prisoner of Paradise (1980 film), an American pornographic exploitation film
 Prisoner of Paradise (2002 film), an internationally co-produced documentary film